Sphacelodes is a genus of moths in the family Geometridae first described by Achille Guenée in 1857.

Species
Sphacelodes vulneraria (Hübner, 1819–21)
Sphacelodes fusilineatus (Walker, 1860)
Sphacelodes haitiaria Oberthür, 1923

References

Geometridae